Brenda Bettinson (born 1929) is a British-American artist, muralist, radio station art editor, and professor.

Biography
Bettinson was born in 1929 in King's Lynn, England. Her father Randall C. Bettinson served in the Royal Engineers Regiment. Bettinson studied art in London, Paris and Rome. In London she studied at Saint Martin's School of Art and passed her exam in 'Arts and Crafts' in 1948. In Paris she studied and collaborated with Etruscologist Raymond Bloch.

Career
Bettinson's first solo exhibition was at the Twenty Brook Street Gallery in London in 1948. She painted numerous murals and large panels on commission including works for the Vatican Pavilion at the 1964 New York World's Fair and at Calvary Hospital in the Bronx. Bettinson was the art editor for Riverside Radio WRVR-FM, New York from 1961 to 1965. Later she served as professor of art at Pace University in New York for 27 years until her retirement in 1990 as Professor Emeritus. Bettinson lectured at the Katonah Gallery, New York and taught in its docent program and was a Society for the Renewal of Christian Art consultant. She won the gold medal from the National Arts Club, New York in 1966.

Bettinson now resides on Barter's Island, Maine and continues to produce work.

After retiring from the academic world, Bettinson moved to Barter's Island, Maine. 
In addition to Mathias Fine Art gallery in Trevett, Bettinson has shown her work at Unity College, Bates College, the Center for Maine Contemporary Art, the Ogunquit Museum of American Art and the Holocaust and Human Rights Center, University of Augusta.

In recent years Bettinson's studio output has focused on imagery about war including a series about the Second World War women's concentration camp at Ravensbrueck.

References

External links
 Brenda Bettinson collection, 1996–2009, Abplanalp Library, University of New England

1929 births
Living people
20th-century American painters
20th-century American women artists
20th-century British women artists
20th-century British painters
21st-century American women artists
21st-century British women artists
Alumni of Saint Martin's School of Art
Pace University faculty
Painters from Maine
People from Boothbay, Maine
People from King's Lynn
American women academics